The Fulcidacini, sometimes known as the warty leaf beetles, are a tribe within the leaf beetle subfamily Cryptocephalinae, though historically they were often treated as a distinct subfamily, Chlamisinae. 11 genera with altogether about 400 species are currently placed here; some four-fifths of the species are found in the Neotropics, but the rest is distributed over all other continents except Antarctica.

Genera and some selected species include:
 Chlamisus Rafinesque, 1815
 Chlamisus amyemae Reid, 1991
 Chlamisus arizonensis Linell, 1898
 Chlamisus aterrimus Lea, 1904
 Chlamisus flavidus Karren, 1972
 Chlamisus foveolatus Knoch, 1801
 Chlamisus huachucae Schaeffer, 1906
 Chlamisus maculipes Chevrolat, 1835
 Chlamisus mimosae Karren, 1989
 Chlamisus minax Lacordaire
 Chlamisus nigromaculatus Karren, 1972
 Chlamisus quadrilobatus Schaeffer, 1926
 Chlamisus texanus Schaeffer, 1906
 Diplacaspis Jacobson, 1924
 Diplacaspis prosternalis Schaeffer, 1906
 Exema
 Poropleura Lacordaire, 1848 (=Fulcidax Voet, 1806, an unavailable name)
 Poropleura bacca (Kirby, 1818)
 Poropleura coelestina (Lacordaire, 1848)
 Poropleura monstrosa (Fabricius, 1798)
 Melitochlamys Monrós, 1948
 Neochlamisus (c.17 species)
 Pseudochlamys Lacordaire, 1848
 Pseudochlamys megalostomoides Lacordaire, 1849
 Pseudochlamys semirufescens Karren, 1972

Footnotes

References
  (2008): Faecal case architecture in the gibbosus species group of Neochlamisus Karren, 1972 (Coleoptera: Chrysomelidae: Cryptocephalinae: Chlamisini). Zool. J. Linn. Soc. 152(2): 315–351.  (HTML abstract)

External links
 

Cryptocephalinae